Steven Mellor (1973, in Macclesfield) competed for Great Britain in the swimming events at the 1992 Olympic Games in Barcelona.

Swimming career
The 19 year old qualified for the final of the men's 4 x 200 f/s, finishing in sixth place in a new British Record.

Mellor also went on to win a bronze medal when representing England at the 1994 Commonwealth Games in Victoria, Canada, in the 4 x 200 metres freestyle relay.

He won the 1994 British Championship in the 400 metres freestyle.

Personal life
Having represented his country for over 15 years, Mellor retired from the sport in 2002 and now runs a successful sports travel business.

References

1973 births
21st-century English businesspeople
Living people
Olympic swimmers of Great Britain
Sportspeople from Macclesfield
Swimmers at the 1992 Summer Olympics
Swimmers at the 1994 Commonwealth Games
Commonwealth Games medallists in swimming
Commonwealth Games bronze medallists for England
English male swimmers
Medallists at the 1994 Commonwealth Games